Distant Lights may refer to:

 Distant Lights (1987 film), an Italian science fiction thriller
 Distant Lights (2003 film), a German drama
 Distant Lights (EP), a 2006 EP by Burial
 "Distant Lights", a 2011 song by Ivy

See also 
 Distant Light (disambiguation)